Tarapur Assembly constituency is one of 243 legislative assemblies of legislative assembly of Bihar. It comes under Jamui (Lok Sabha constituency). This assembly constituency contains Tarapur Block. The region is dominated by Kushwahas. In the elections of Mukhiya and the President (Pramukh) of the Block, the probability of the victory of candidates belonging to this caste group remains high. In 2022, the polls were conducted for the membership of  Zila Parishad and Mukhiya, and out of ten posts of Mukhia, five were won by the candidate belonging to Kushwaha community. The two posts of member of Zila Parishad also went to candidates from the same community.

Overview
Tarapur comprises CD Blocks Asarganj, Tarapur, Tetiha Bamber & Sangrampur; Gram Panchayats Ramankabad (West), Ramankabad (East), Majhgyan,
Murade, Gangata, Dariyapur-1 & 2 & Kharagpur (NA) of Kharagpur CD Block.

Members of Legislative Assembly

Election Results

2021 By-election

2020

2015

2010

See also
 List of Assembly constituencies of Bihar

Sources
Bihar Assembly Election Results in 1951
Bihar Assembly Election Results in 1957
Bihar Assembly Election Results in 1962
Bihar Assembly Election Results in 1967
Bihar Assembly Election Results in 1969
Bihar Assembly Election Results in 1972
Bihar Assembly Election Results in 1977
Bihar Assembly Election Results in 1980
Bihar Assembly Election Results in 1985
Bihar Assembly Election Results in 1990
Bihar Assembly Election Results in 1995
Bihar Assembly Election Results in 2000
Bihar Assembly Election Results in 2005
Bihar Assembly Election Results in 2010

References

External links
 

Politics of Munger district
Assembly constituencies of Bihar